Kamehameha may refer to:

House of Kamehameha
House of Kamehameha, the dynasty of the Hawaiian Kings
Kamehameha I (1736–1819), first king of the Hawaiian Islands
Kamehameha II (1797–1824), second king of the Kingdom of Hawaii
Kamehameha III (1813–1854), King of Hawaii from 1825 to 1854
Kamehameha IV (1834–1863), fourth king of Hawaii from 1855 to 1863
Kamehameha V (1830–1872), reigned as monarch of the Kingdom of Hawaiʻi from 1863 to 1872
Albert Kamehameha (1858–1862), crown prince of Hawaii
David Kamehameha (1828–1835), member of the royal family of the Kingdom of Hawaii

Other uses
Kamehameha (Dragon Ball), a fictional technique mainly attributed to Son Goku, a character in the Dragon Ball media franchise
Kamehameha Highway, one of the main highways in Oʻahu
Kamehameha Schools, private school system in Hawaiʻi
Kamehameha Day, public holiday in Hawaii on June 11
Fort Kamehameha, former United States Army military base
King Kamehameha (horse) (foaled 2001), Japanese Thoroughbred racehorse and sire
USS Kamehameha (SSBN-642), Benjamin Franklin-class ballistic missile submarine
Kamehameha butterfly, a species of butterfly endemic to Hawaii

See also